The Japan national football team in 2014, managed by head coach Alberto Zaccheroni, compete in the 2014 FIFA World Cup, in amongst international friendly matches both at home and abroad, as they progress towards the 2014 FIFA World Cup and 2015 AFC Asian Cup. After the World Cup, Javier Aguirre had been appointed as the new head coach.

Record

Kits

Schedule

Friendly matches

2014 World Cup

Players statistics

Goalscorers

References

External links
Japan Football Association

Japan national football team results
2014 in Japanese football
Japan